Mailapur, is a village in Yadgir taluk of Yadgir district in Karnataka state, India. Mailapura is a holy place. Sri Mailapur Mailaralingeshwara Temple is located in the village. It is religious place of lakhs of devotees. In this village, they celebrate two Jatras per year namely as deepavali and makara sankramana.

Demographics
 census, Mailapur had 1,497 inhabitants, with 789 males and 708 females.

See also
Shahapur, Karnataka
Bonal Bird Sanctuary
Shorapur
Yadgir

References

External links
 

Villages in Yadgir district